Israelis in India may be immigrants and expatriates from Israel, or Indians of Israeli descent. Many of them reside in Goa, Thane and Raigad districts of Maharashtra. Some have started businesses such as restaurants and boutiques. The most spoken languages among Jewish Indians and Israelis in India tend to be Marathi, Konkani and Hindi as well as their native language of Hebrew.

Popular culture
 Flipping Out - An Israeli documentary film describing the drug use of Israeli men and women in India

See also

 India–Israel relations
 Indians in Israel
 History of the Jews in India

References

Israelis
Israelis
 
Israeli diaspora